Halves are an ambient band based in Dublin, Ireland. It is composed of Brian Cash and brothers Tim and Elis Czerniak, with additional live members.

Formation
Halves was formed when Dave, Brian and Tim sat down together and listed bands & composers they admired. They decided on the band's image, including their website & artwork and the visuals of their live shows and had “a very clear manifesto about the kind of sound we wanted and the kind of thing we wanted to do, which not many bands in this country Ireland were doing”. Elis joined soon after and work began on their debut release.

Recordings
The band has released two EPs; the self-titled Halves and 2008's seven-track Haunt Me When I'm Drowsy. These were followed by the single "Blood Branches" in March 2009 on a split 7-inch with fellow Dublin band Subplots.

In 2010, their debut album It Goes, It Goes (Forever & Ever) was released to critical acclaim. The album was released in the UK and mainland Europe on 4 July 2011. Recorded in the legendary Hotel2Tango studios in Montreal (housed in a former alarm factory beside a freight railroad) and tracked over two sunny weeks in August 2009, the record was created with the use of the studio's vast collection of antique instruments, amps, organs, effects (most of which date from the 1930s). Eleven songs were recorded live, in one large room on 2″ reel-to-reel tape by Efrim Menuck (Godspeed You! Black Emperor), Howard Bilerman, and Radwan Moumneh. Guest performers on the record include: Amy Millan (Stars/Broken Social Scene), Katie Kim, Phil Boughton (Subplots), Canadian harpist Elaine Kelly-Canning (Carnival Moon), Irish Chamber brass and string players and twenty-seven members of the Kilkenny Ladies' choir. It Goes, It Goes (Forever & Ever) was shortlisted for the Choice Music Prize for Irish Album of the Year 2010.

The band released their second studio album Boa Howl in July 2013 to critical acclaim.

Live
Halves has played Oxegen 2008 and Electric Picnic 2008 as well as Hard Working Class Heroes, IMRO Showcase Tour and the London Calling showcase in London, England.  In 2009 Halves made their debut TV performance, topping the viewers choice poll on RTÉ's 'Other Voices' series. They have supported British Sea Power, 65daysofstatic, Low, Amiina, This Will Destroy You, The Middle East & Mercury Rev. Their 2008 appearance at Eurosonic Festival in Holland was their first outside Ireland and they have since travelled twice to Toronto to play at Canadian Music Week and Texas for SXSW. Other festival outings include Kilkenny Arts Festival Kilkenny in 2010 and The Great Escape Brighton, England in 2011

The band is known for switching between a wide range of instruments while performing - including Electric Guitars, dulcimer, Drum Kit, Piano, vocoder, Synth, laptop, Accordion, Clarinet, Flugelhorn, Trombone and various effects. Stunning pre-programmed and live visuals can be seen at their live shows performed by the group Slipdraft, whose members are Sam Boles, Daniel Staines and Cormac Murray. The band's live sound engineer is Ciaran Mangan who also recorded their live album.

In April 2012, the band released a live album ('Live at the Unitarian Church') to celebrate Record Store Day 2012.

Discography

Studio albums

Singles

Extended plays

Awards

Choice Music Prize
It Goes, It Goes (Forever & Ever) was nominated for the Choice Music Prize in 2011 and the band performed two songs live at the awards in Dublin's Vicar Street.

|-
| 2011 || It Goes, It Goes (Forever & Ever)] || Irish Album of the Year 2010 ||

References

External links
 Halves site
 Facebook
 YouTube
 Twitter
 Halves photography

Irish indie rock groups
Irish electronic music groups
Irish post-rock groups
Musical groups established in 2006
Musical groups from Dublin (city)
Musical quintets